Aphroditus or Aphroditos was a male Aphrodite originating from Amathus on the island of Cyprus and celebrated in Athens.

Aphroditus was portrayed as having a female shape and clothing like Aphrodite's but also a phallus, and hence, a male name. This deity would have arrived in Athens from Cyprus in the 4th century BC. In the 5th century BC, however, there existed hermae of Aphroditus, or phallic statues with a female head.

Aphroditus is the same as the later god Hermaphroditos, whose name derives from his being regarded as the son of Aphrodite and Hermes. Hermaphroditos first appeared in the Characters of Theophrastus. Photius also explained that Aphroditus was Hermaphroditos, and cited fragments from Attic comedies mentioning the divinity.

One of the earliest surviving images from Athens is a fragment (late 4th century BC), found in the Athenian agora, of a clay mould for a terracotta figurine.

This combination of the male and female in one divinity and being associated with the moon, both of which were considered to have fertilizing powers, was regarded as having an influence over the entire animal and vegetable creation.

Etymology

Aphroditus seems to be the male version of Aphrodite, with the female thematic ending -ē exchanged for the male thematic ending -os, as paralleled e.g. in Cleopatra/Cleopatros or Andromache/Andromachus.

Origins

Worship
According to Macrobius, who mentions the goddess in his Saturnalia, Philochorus, in his Atthis (referred to by Macrobius), identifies this god with the Moon and says that at their sacrifices men and women exchanged clothing. Philostratus, in describing the rituals involved in the festivals, said that the image or the impersonator of the god was accompanied by a large train of followers in which girls mingled with men because the festivals allowed "women to act the part of men, and men put on woman's clothing and play the woman".

Literature
Theophrastus (c. 371 – c. 287 BC), Characters 16.10
"On the fourth and seventh days of each month, he directs mulled wine to be prepared, and going himself to purchase myrtle-wreaths, frankincense and convolvuluses; he returns to spend the day worshiping the statue of Hermaphroditus."

Philochorus (c. 337–283 BC), Atthis

Pausanias (c. 110 – c. 180 AD), Description of Greece 1.19.2 
"Concerning the district called The Gardens, and the temple of Aphrodite, there is no story that is told by them, nor yet about the Aphrodite which stands near the temple. Now the shape of it is square, like that of the Hermae, and the inscription declares that the Heavenly Aphrodite is the oldest of those called Fates. But the statue of Aphrodite in the Gardens is the work of Alcamenes, and one of the most note worthy things in Athens."

Alciphron (c. 125 – after 180 AD), Epistles 3.37
"Having woven a garland of flowers, I repaired to the temple of Hermaphroditus, to fix it there, in honour of my deceased husband Phaedria: but I was seized there by Moschion and his companions. He had been teasing me to marry him; but I refused, partly through compassion for my young children; and also because my dear Phaedria is ever in my thoughts."

Philostratus (c. 190 – c. 230 AD), Imagines 1.2
"The torches give a faint light, enough for the revellers to see what is close in front of them, but not enough for us to see them. Peals of laughter rise, and women rush along with men, wearing men's sandals and garments girt in strange fashion; for the revel permits women to masquerade as men, and men to "put on women's garb" and to ape the walk of women."

Macrobius (c. 400s AD), Saturnalia 3.8.2
"There's also a statue of Venus on Cyprus, that's bearded, shaped and dressed like a woman, with scepter and male genitals, and they conceive her as both male and female. Aristophanes calls her Aphroditus, and Laevius says: Worshiping, then, the nurturing god Venus, whether she is male or female, just as the Moon is a nurturing goddess. In his Atthis Philochorus, too, states that she is the Moon and that men sacrifice to her in women's dress, women in men's, because she is held to be both male and female."

See also
 Agdistis
 Ancient history of Cyprus
 Aphrodite of the Gardens
 Paeon of Amathus

Notes

References

External links

 
 Venus Barbata, Roman Mythology Index at mythindex.com
 Hermaphrodism among Gods and Mortals by Edward Carpenter (1914)
 Hermaphrodite Goddesses and Queer Priests - Academic Paper by Jeramy Townsley

Androgynous and hermaphroditic deities
Fertility deities
Greek love and lust deities
Ancient Cyprus
LGBT in Cyprus
Lunar gods
Lunar goddesses